The annual worldwide market share of personal computer vendors includes desktop computers, laptop computers, and netbooks but excludes mobile devices, such as tablet computers that do not fall under the category of 2-in-1 PCs. The global market leader has been Chinese technology company Lenovo since 2013, with the exception of year 2017.

Top vendors market share (2022)

Historical vendors market share

2021

2016–2020

2011–2015

2006–2010

2001–2005

1996–2000

 Toshiba personal computer division was sold to Sharp in 2019, now Dynabook.
 IBM sold its personal computer business to Lenovo in 2005, and its x86 server division in 2014.
 Compaq was acquired by HP in 2002.
 Fujitsu figures include Fujitsu Siemens.
 Figures include desktop PCs, mobile PCs, and servers using the Intel x86 processor architecture.  1996–1999 figures exclude x86 PCs.
 Figures subject to revision in later data releases.

Unit sales

Worldwide (1996–2020) 

Sales volume worldwide grew rapidly in the late 1990s but declined briefly around the early 2000s recession. Sales increased again for the rest of the decade though more slowly during the late 2000s recession. After substantial growth in 2010, sales volume started declining in 2012 which continued for seven consecutive years until 2019.

(*) Figures include desktop PCs, mobile PCs, and servers using the Intel x86 processor architecture.  1996–1999 figures exclude x86 PCs.

Worldwide (1975–1995)

Japan

See also
 List of computer hardware manufacturers
 List of computer system manufacturers
 List of laptop brands and manufacturers

References

Personal computers
Personal computer vendors